Charles Ker may refer to:

Charles Henry Bellenden Ker (c. 1785 – 1871), legal reformer
Charles Innes-Ker, 11th Duke of Roxburghe
Charles Ker (chess) in New Zealand Chess Championship

See also
Charles Kerr (disambiguation)
Charles Carr (disambiguation), variant spelling